Kyla Jan Aragones Inquig (born 24 January 1997) is a Filipino footballer who has played for the Philippines women's national football team.

College career
Kyla Jan Aragones Inquig, who hails from Dumaguete, plays for the De La Salle University women's team which competes in University Athletic Association of the Philippines (UAAP) Football Championship. According to De La Salle coach Hans Smit, Inquig was self taught in football and only experienced "real training" when she got into the school's team. In 2017, at UAAP Season 79 she helped De La Salle win the women's football title by winning over the University of Santo Tomas (UST).

Inquig led De La Salle again to the final in UAAP Season 80 where her school faced UST again. Inquig scored a brace in the match which ended in a 2-1 victory for De La Salle clinching the second straight title for her school. That match was her last UAAP game for De La Salle since she graduated from the school within the same year.

International career
Inquig played for the Philippine U16 team at the 2013 AFC U-19 Women's Championship qualifiers in November 2012. Inquig received her first call up to senior national team in 2017. She was touted for the 2018 AFC Women's Asian Cup qualifiers but she was forced to beg off citing academic reason. She was later included the Philippine final line in the 2017 Southeast Asian Games. She also played in the 2018 AFF Women's Championship. where she scored a goal in the 3-3 draw against the hosts, Indonesia.

International goals

References

Living people
Filipino women's footballers
Philippines women's international footballers
Women's association football midfielders
De La Salle University alumni
University Athletic Association of the Philippines footballers
People from Dumaguete
1997 births